The 1977 Brazilian Grand Prix was a Formula One motor race held at Interlagos on 23 January 1977.

Qualifying

Qualifying classification

Race

Report 
James Hunt took pole again with Carlos Reutemann second and Mario Andretti third on the grid. Home hero Carlos Pace took the lead at the start, with Hunt dropping behind Reutemann as well but soon Hunt was back behind Pace and attacking. There was contact, and Hunt took the lead whereas Pace had to pit for repairs. Hunt led Reutemann until he began to suffer from tyre troubles and was passed by Reutemann. Hunt pitted for new tyres, and rejoined fourth and soon passed Niki Lauda in the Ferrari and John Watson to reclaim second. Reutemann marched on to victory, Hunt was second and Lauda third after Watson crashed out.

Classification

Championship standings after the race

Drivers' Championship standings

Constructors' Championship standings

Note: Only the top five positions are included for both sets of standings.

References

Brazilian Grand Prix
Brazilian Grand Prix
Grand Prix
Brazilian Grand Prix